Miss X is a character in the DC Comics universe. She first appeared in Action Comics #26 (May 1940), in the feature "Tex Thompson".  Although her secret identity was never expressly revealed, the reader was led to believe it was Margaret Janice Peggy Maloney, the daughter of District Attorney Maloney.

Fictional character biography
Miss X aided Tex Thompson and Bob Daley after the third member of their team, Gargantua T. Potts, left to become a cook in the French Army. She wore no costume, and her sole disguise consisted of a pair of dark sunglasses. Tex was intrigued and obsessed with finding out who the mysterious Miss X was. In the final panel of Action Comics #29, he confided to his partner that he thought he had figured out who she was.

In Action Comics #33, Thompson was declared dead. This turned out to be a ruse, and Thompson returned as Mister America. Miss X made her final appearance in Action Comics #43 (Dec. 1941).

References

External links
Miss X at Don Markstein's Toonopedia. Archived from the original on march 8, 2016.

Comics characters introduced in 1940
DC Comics female superheroes
DC Comics superheroes